Kalpetta is a major town and municipality in the Wayanad district, state of Kerala, India. Kalpetta is the headquarters of Wayanad district, as well as the headquarters of Vythiri taluk. It is a bustling town surrounded by dense coffee and tea plantations and mountains. It lies on the Kozhikode-Mysore National Highway NH 766 (formerly NH 212) at an altitude of about 780 m above sea level. Kalpetta is 72 km from Kozhikode and 140 km from Mysore.

Apart from being the administrative capital of the district, Kalpetta is also the main hub of tourism activities in Wayanad due to its central location within the district and its proximity to most visited tourist sites. There is a good number of hotels and resorts within and surrounding the city of Kalpetta.

Etymology
It is believed that the early Jain residents who migrated from Karnataka had named the place "Kalpetta". In Kannada, the words "Kal" and "Pettah" mean "deposits of stones". Rocks, large and small, are found throughout the landscape of Kalpetta. Hence this name was derived.

History

Kalpetta was under the rule of Western Ganga dynasty until AD930. Through ages this region fell into the rule of Hoysala Empire, Vijayanagara Empire, and Kingdom of Mysore. Pazhassi Raja was the next to rule the region. Kalpetta Nair administered the place as the representative for Pazhassi Raja. Mysorean invasion of Kerala made Kalpetta a part of Tipu Sultan's empire. This continued until the demise of Tipu Sultan. Along with the rest of Malabar, Kalpetta also came under British rule after Tipu Sultan's demise.

In Wayanad, the Indian independence movement started first at Kalpetta. The first political conference was held in 1921 under the leadership of Dharmaraja Iyer. K. P. Kesava Menon and A. K. Gopalan participated in this meeting. Formation of the committee of Indian National Congress also occurred around the same time. Father of the nation, Mahatma Gandhi visited Kalpetta on 1934 January 14.

Kalpetta became the headquarters when Wayanad district was formed on 1 November 1980. Kalpetta was still a Village Panchayath when it became district headquarters and it attained Municipality status on 1 April 1990.

Demographics
 India census, Kalpetta had a population of 31,580. Males constitute 49% of the population and females 51%. In Kalpetta, 11% of the population is under the age of 6.

People
Being the district headquarters, Kalpetta is home to a large number of government offices. Besides, the district level offices of Media Houses, Political Parties etc. also function out of Kalpetta. Hence a large section of the population of Kalpetta are office-goers. Like elsewhere in Kerala, Hindus, Muslims and Christians live in harmony in Kalpetta. There is a significant Jain population also in Kalpetta.

Transport

Kalpetta has very good road connectivity with the rest of Kerala and neighbouring South Indian cities. NH766 connects Kalpetta with Kozhikode and Mysore. State Highways connect Kalpetta with Ooty in Tamil Nadu and Madikeri in Karnataka.
En route to Mysore on NH 766, past Wayanad district boundary, which is also the Kerala state boundary, NH 766 passes through Bandipur National Park. There is a night traffic ban imposed on this stretch from 9pm to 6am since 2009. The alternate road to take is, leave NH 766 at Kalpetta and proceed to Mysore through Mananthavady, Kutta, Gonikoppal, and Hunsur.

The nearest airport is Calicut International Airport, 90  km from Kalpetta. Kannur international airport is 100 km from Kalpetta

Tourist attractions

 Mahathma Gandhi Museum
 Myladippara 
Pookode Lake
En ooru tribal heritage village 
Anantnath Swami Temple
Lakkidi View Point
Chembra Peak
Soochipara Falls
Kanthanpara Falls 
900 Kandi
Kurumbalakotta hill 

Banasura sagar dam

Economy

The Wayanad dairy of Milma (Kerala Co-operative Milk Marketing Federation) is situated at Chuzhali within Kalpetta Municipal Limits.
There is a Mini Industries Park promoted by Kinfra at Kalpetta. Several small scale industries function out of this Park.
Tourism and hospitality industry experienced a boom in recent years. This has led to mushrooming of resorts throughout Wayanad, with the largest concentration of hotels and resorts at Kalpetta and adjoining areas within Vythiri taluk.

Education

 Kerala Veterinary and Animal Sciences University, Pookode (14 km from Kalpetta)
 College of Veterinary and Animal Sciences at Pookode (14  km from Kalpetta)
 Oriental School of Hotel Management located at Lakkidi (15  km from Kalpetta)
 DM WIMS Medical College located at Meppadi (15  km) is the only Medical College in Wayanad district
 College of Dairy Science and Technology, Pookode offers B.Tech degree course in Dairy Science & Technology
 DM WIMS Nursing College located at Meppadi
 Kendriya Vidyalaya, Kalpetta
 SKMJ Higher Secondary School, Kalpetta
 De Paul Public School, Kalpetta
NSS Higher Secondary School, Kalpetta
HIM UP School, Kalpetta
 Govt.College, Vellaramkunnu, Kalpetta.
 St: Joseph's Convent School, Kalpetta.
 Jawahar Navodaya, Kalpetta
 M.S. Swaminathan Research Foundation, Kalpetta

Notable personalities
 Kalpatta Narayanan - Indian Poet and Novelist
 Abu Salim - Actor
 M. P. Veerendra Kumar - Writer and politician
 Anu Sithara - Actress
 Sunny Wayne - Actor
 Midhun Manuel Thomas - Script writer and director

Climate

See also
 Chundale
 Meppadi
 Muttil, Kalpetta
 Vythiri

References

External links

 

Cities and towns in Wayanad district
Kalpetta area